The Japan national football team in 2012, managed by head coach Alberto Zaccheroni, competed against international exhibition matches both at home and abroad and later in the third and fourth rounds of the 2014 FIFA World Cup qualification.

Record

Kits

Schedule
International Friendly (2012 Kirin Challenge Cup)

2014 FIFA World Cup qualification (AFC) Third Round

International Friendly (2012 Kirin Challenge Cup)

2014 FIFA World Cup qualification (AFC) Fourth Round

2014 FIFA World Cup qualification (AFC) Fourth Round

2014 FIFA World Cup qualification (AFC) Fourth Round

International Friendly (2012 Kirin Challenge Cup)

International Friendly (2012 Kirin Challenge Cup)

2014 FIFA World Cup qualification (AFC) Fourth Round

International Friendly

International Friendly

2014 FIFA World Cup qualification (AFC) Fourth Round

Players statistics

Goalscorers

References

External links
Japan Football Association

Japan national football team results
2012 in Japanese football
Japan